Torpedo (Also known as 'U-235') is a 2019 Belgian action & war film directed by Sven Huybrechts and starring Koen De Bouw. The movie is loosely based on true events.

Plot 
In Nazi-occupied Belgium in 1943, a group of Flemish resistance fighters under the command of Stan (Koen De Bouw) and known for their brutal and bloody attacks on Nazi forces, are tasked with completing a secret mission for the Allies which could help end the war. Kapitein Maes (Vic De Wachter) of the Belgian headquarters in London, instructs them to travel to the Belgian Congo, where a captured German U-boat lies waiting for them. The group arrives to learn that they will operate the U-boat to bring a cargo of Uranium-235 to New York City to be used in the secret Manhatten Project, which will end up creating the nuclear bomb. A captured German U-boat commander named Kapitänleutnant Franz Jäger (Thure Riefenstein) is tasked with training the group of resistance fighters for three weeks to operate the U-boat in return for his freedom so he could see his son again. However before their training is complete and while the cargo is loaded into the U-boat, German warships near their location to recapture the U-boat, forcing Kapitein Maes to demand an immediate departure for the US. In the argument Kapitänleutnant Jäger accidentally kills Kapitein Maes, leaving Stan in charge. The group successfully evade capture, while the group is joined by a French-speaking Congolese worker named Jenga (Rudy Mukendi) who was left behind during the loading of the cargo by his employer when the attack unfolded.

The untrained group successfully fight off other attacks from the German Navy as well as other incidents, including the flooding of the onboard toilet. It is also revealed that Stan was tortured and his wife and baby child were murdered by a Gestapo officer named Kirchbaum (Martin Semmelrogge) after it was revealed that he had hidden a Jewish family in his home, fueling his hatred for the Nazis. However Stan has yet to tell his daughter Nadine (Ella-June Henrard) what has really happened to her mother and baby brother. During the trip, Filip (Joren Seldeslachts) tells Nadine the truth about her family. By that point the group is stopped by a German destroyer. They quickly figure out that the ship's crew don't realise that they are the U-boat that they're looking for, so the group pretends to be German sailors while a boarding party enters the U-boat. Kapitänleutnant Jäger does the talking while the rest of the group stay quiet as to not blow their cover considering they can't speak German. However Van Praag (Gilles De Schryver), who had both his legs amputated after they were crushed under a fallen torpedo, starts yelling out in pain. Prompting one of the members of the boarding party, who's a doctor, to check on him. Van Praag accidentally blows his cover when he yells out in Flemish and in the ensuing struggle, Van Praag alongside all the members of the German boarding party are killed. With Kapitänleutnant Jäger killing the last member, having a change of heart after hearing about the true intent of the U-boat's cargo and debating that Hitler should never get his hands on such a catastrophic weapon. Nadine manages to disable the destroyer with a well-aimed sniper rifle bullet, but can't prevend the ship from ramming the U-boat.

In the quickly flooding U-boat, the group is split in half. With half the group trapped in the bow, while the other half is trapped in the stern as the U-boat sinks to the seabed. Tamme (Stefan Perceval) drowns as he is unable to evacuate after his wristwatch got caught under some pipes underwater. Nadine is also unable to get to safety in time, being trapped in a slowly filling compartment with the stern door blocked by a fallen pipe. Stan uses the torpedo tubes to escape the U-boat and swims towards the compartment where his daughter is trapped. He moves the pipe, unlocking the stern door and manages to resuscitate Nadine after she had initially drowned when the compartment had fully flooded. Kapitänleutnant Jäger sacrifices himself by swimming to the flooded command center of the U-boat and raising the submarine, clutching a picture of his son on which Klisse (Sven De Ridder) had drawn a Hitler moustache, as he drowns. While the U-boat ascends, Stan dies from an injury he sustained when the U-boat first went down. The surviving members of the mission are then seen relaxing on a beach in the US, where a radio broadcast announces the surrender of Japan following the use of the atomic bombs on Hiroshima and Nagasaki, marking the end of the Second World War.

Cast 
 Koen De Bouw as Stan
 Thure Riefenstein as Kapitänleutnant Franz Jäger
 Ella-June Henrard as Nadine
 Joren Seldeslachts as Filip
 Sven De Ridder as Klisse
 Stefan Perceval as Tamme
 Bert Haelvoet as Fons
 Rudy Mukendi as Jenga
 Gilles De Schryver as Van Praag
 Robrecht Vanden Thoren as Werner
 Vic De Wachter as Kapitein Maes
 Martin Semmelrogge as Kirchbaum
 Steve Geerts as Peter
 Ludwig Hendrickx as German officer

Reception 
The movie was compared to other well-known movies such as U-571 (2000), Das Boot (1981), The Hunt for Red October (1990) and Inglourious Basterds (2009) for its similar plot and tropes.

References

External links 
 
 

2019 films
Belgian war films
Films about the Belgian Resistance
2010s Dutch-language films
2010s French-language films
2010s English-language films
2010s German-language films
Films set in Belgium
Films set in the 1940s
Films set in the 20th century
Films set in the Atlantic Ocean
Films shot in Belgium
Films shot in Malta
2019 multilingual films
Belgian multilingual films
U-boat fiction
World War II submarine films
2010s action war films
Films about submarine warfare
Belgian World War II films